Tomobella is a genus of Malagasy jumping spiders that was first described by T. Szűts & N. Scharff in 2009.  it contains only two species, found only on Madagascar: T. andasibe and T. fotsy.

References

Salticidae genera
Endemic fauna of Madagascar
Salticidae
Spiders of Madagascar